The Dehler 22 is a West German trailerable sailboat that was designed by E. G. van de Stadt and first built in 1983. It is van de Stadt's design number 374.

A kit version for amateur completion, was marketed as the Dehlya 22.

Production
The design was built by Dehler Yachts in West Germany from 1983 to 1987, but it is now out of production.

Design
The Dehler 22 is a recreational keelboat, built predominantly of fiberglass, with wood trim. It has a fractional sloop rig; a raked stem; an open, walk-through reverse transom with a gate; an internally mounted spade-type rudder controlled by a tiller and a fixed fin keel or stub keel with a swing keel. The water ballast is drained, making the boat lighter for road transport. The lifting keel is raised and lowered by a worm gear operated from the deck by a winch handle.

The boat is normally fitted with a small  outboard motor for docking and maneuvering, on a vertical sliding mount.

The design has sleeping accommodation for four people, with a double "V"-berth in the bow cabin and two straight settees quarter berths in the main cabin. The galley is a slide out unit, located under the companionway ladder. The galley is equipped with a two-burner stove and a sink. The head is located in the bow cabin, under the "V"-berth.

Operational history
In a 2010 review Steve Henkel wrote, "compare this design to the Sirius 21 and 22 ... by the same designer. All have a number of high-quality features. All are well-finished and good looking, and are among our favorites in this size range. Best features: Clever and unusual features (of which some were optional) include an outboard motor which slides up and down the transom to reduce drag under sail; a combination of lifting keel and water ballast tank (440 pounds of water, 440 pounds of lead shot in the lifting keel) to keep towing weight low; a worm-drive operated on deck with a standard winch handle to raise and lower the keel; easily removable rudder; floating slipway trolley that rides piggyback on a roll-on, roll-off road trailer; extra stays to prevent mast sway at the launching site and to allow singlehanded rigging and unrigging; slide-out galley unit; opening transom gate for swimming; and availability of kits for finishing at home. Worst features: Price new was high, and remains high on resale."

See also
List of sailing boat types

References

External links
Photo of a Dehler 22
Video of a Dehler 22 sailing
Video of a Dehler 22 sailing with spinnaker

Keelboats
1980s sailboat type designs
Sailing yachts
Trailer sailers
Sailboat type designs by E. G. van de Stadt
Sailboat types built by Dehler Yachts